The Colgate Raiders represented Colgate University in ECAC women's ice hockey during the 2014–15 NCAA Division I women's ice hockey season.

Offseason

Sept. 22:  Lauren Wildfang was selected for the Team Canada Fall Festival in Calgary.

Recruiting

Roster

Schedule

|-
!colspan=12 style="background:#862633;color:white;"| Regular Season

References

Colgate
Colgate Raiders women's ice hockey seasons